Declared historic buildings of Hangzhou, China, are districts, artifacts or buildings legally declared to be "protected". According to the "Regularations of historic districts and historic buildings in Hangzhou" effective from 1 January 2005, historic buildings are those artifacts or districts that have lasted more than 50 years, and of significant values for history, science, and art study. In Hangzhou, declaring a historic house requires consulting the urban planning administration bureau, and the real estate administration bureau.

As of 31 June 2011, there are 287 declared historic buildings in Hangzhou, proclaimed as five batches. There are plans for a sixth batch that will include 51 historic houses.

List of second batch of declared historic buildings in Hangzhou
47 buildings were declared to be the second batch of historic houses in Hangzhou, in July 2005. The following information is provided by Real Estate Admiustration Bureau & Research Institute for Historic buildings in Hang zhou.

References 

Buildings and structures in Hangzhou